Rola Khaled (born 1 January 1984) is a Lebanese female Muaythai practitioner. She also competed at the Asian Beach Games in 2014 and 2016, claiming silver medals each in the women's 60kg featherweight event and women's 63.5kg light welterweight event.

Rola also represented Lebanon at the 2017 Asian Indoor and Martial Arts Games and clinched a bronze medal in the women's 63.5kg event.

References 

1984 births
Living people
Lebanese Muay Thai practitioners
Female Muay Thai practitioners